is a railway station in Suma-ku, Kobe, Hyōgo Prefecture, Japan.

Lines
Kobe Municipal Subway
Seishin-Yamate Line - Station S10
Sanyo Electric Railway
Main Line - Station SY 02

Layout

Sanyo Railway Main Line
two side platforms serving a track each

Seishin-Yamate Line
an island platform serving two tracks

History
The first station known as Itayado opened in 1910 as a surface station on the Sanyo Electric Railway. In 1977, the first stretch of the Seishin-Yamate Line opened.

The station was affected by the 1995 Kobe earthquake on January 17, 1995. While the Seishin-Yamate Line resumed limited service the following day, the Sanyo Electric Railway station was heavily damaged in the earthquake and consequently had to be relocated underground. Service was suspended on the railway until the new underground station opened in March of that year.

Adjacent stations

|-
!colspan=5|Sanyo Electric Railway (SY 02)

Railway stations in Hyōgo Prefecture
Stations of Kobe Municipal Subway
Railway stations in Japan opened in 1910